A Trip to Paradise is a 1921 American silent drama film directed by Maxwell Karger and starring Bert Lytell, Virginia Valli, and Brinsley Shaw. It was released on September 5, 1921.

Cast list
 Bert Lytell as Curley Flynn
 Virginia Valli as Nora O'Brien
 Brinsley Shaw as Meek
 Unice Vin Moore as Widow Boland
 Victory Bateman as Mrs. Smiley
 Eva Gordon as Mary

References

American silent feature films
American black-and-white films
American films based on plays
Films directed by Maxwell Karger
Metro Pictures films
1921 drama films
1921 films
Silent American drama films
1920s English-language films
1920s American films